Leopard plant is a common name for several plants and can refer to:

Drimiopsis maculata, native to Tanzania to South Africa
Farfugium japonicum syn. Ligularia tussilaginea, also known as green leopard plant, native to Japan
Ligularia, a genus with numerous species known as leopard plant

See also
Leopard pitcher-plant
Leopard lily